Marie-Louise Dreier (born 3 October 1936) in Brussels is a poet living in Bex in the canton of Vaud, Switzerland. 

Dreier spent her childhood in Andenne. On the advice of her parents, she studied to become a secretary and then she took art studies at the Ecole Normale of the University of Quebec where she decided to become a French teacher. She has written several books of poems and has received distinctions. Dreier is a member of the  Association vaudoise des écrivains (Vaud writers association) and the Association des écrivaines et écrivains suisses (Swiss writers association) and of the Olten Group.

Awards
She received the Paul Budry Prize in 1977, the prize of the town of Montpellier (France), the gold medal of the Lutèce Academy in 1978, the golden medal of the town of Paris in 1979, the classical prize for the integral part of her works (Canada 1982) and the prize of honor for foreign poets by the Copenhagen  Faculty  of literature.

Bibliography 
 Aux vagues du jour, Éditions Eliane Vernay, Genève, 1977
 Avant qu`il ne fût jour, Éditions Eliane Vernay, Genève, 1978 
 Spirales, Ed. Vieille Presse, Neuchâtel, 1981
 Plain-Chant, Ed. Randin, Aigle, 1984
 Garance, L`Aire, Lausanne, 1988
 Moissons, Ed. R. Layaz, 2002

References 

1936 births
Living people
Swiss women poets
20th-century Swiss poets
People from the canton of Vaud
Writers from Brussels
21st-century Swiss poets
21st-century Belgian women writers
20th-century Belgian women writers